Rasheed Bertrand (November 2, 1982) is a Dominican international footballer who plays with Dublanc FC in the Dominica Premiere League.

Playing career 
Bertrand played with London City of the Canadian Soccer League in 2009. In 2016, he signed with Dublanc FC of the Dominica Premiere League.

International career 
He made his international debut on September 25, 2010 against Barbados. He has made a total of 11 appearances for the national team.

References

External links
 
 

1982 births
Living people
Dominica international footballers
Dominica footballers
Dominica expatriate footballers
London City players
Canadian Soccer League (1998–present) players
Expatriate soccer players in Canada
Dominica expatriate sportspeople in Canada
Association football midfielders